Lupin the Third, Lupin III, Lupin the 3rd or Lupin the IIIrd is a Japanese media franchise.

Lupin the Third may also refer to:

 Lupin III, original manga series
 Arsène Lupin III, the franchise's titular character
 Lupin the 3rd: Treasure of the Sorcerer King, video game
 Lupin the Third: Lupin Is Dead, Zenigata Is in Love, video game

Television
 Lupin the 3rd Part I: The Classic Adventures, first anime television series
 Lupin the 3rd Part II, second anime television series
 Lupin the 3rd Part III: The Pink Jacket Adventures, third anime television series
 Lupin the Third: The Woman Called Fujiko Mine, fourth anime television series
 Lupin the 3rd Part IV: The Italian Adventure, fifth anime television series
 Lupin the 3rd Part V: Misadventures in France, sixth anime television series
 Lupin the 3rd Part 6, seventh anime television series
 Lupin the 3rd vs. Detective Conan, anime television special

Film
 Lupin the Third: Pilot Film, short anime film created as a television pilot (1969)
 Lupin III: Strange Psychokinetic Strategy, first live-action theatrical film (1974)
 The Mystery of Mamo, originally titled simply Lupin III, first theatrical anime film (1978)
 Lupin III: The Castle of Cagliostro, theatrical anime film (1979)
 Lupin the 3rd vs. Detective Conan: The Movie, theatrical anime film (2013)
 Lupin the 3rd, second live-action theatrical film (2014)
 Lupin III: The First, 3D CGI-anime film (2019)